Büyük Mecmua was a magazine which was briefly published in the Ottoman Empire during the Independence War between 1919 and 1920. It is one of the many publications that were launched and edited by Turkish journalist couple Sabiha and Zekeriya Sertel.

History and profile
The first issue of Büyük Mecmua which was headquartered in Cağaloğlu, İstanbul, appeared on 6 March 1919. Sabiha and Zekeriya Sertel were among the founders of the magazine which aimed to raise the awareness among people about the significance of unity and support for the Independence War. The magazine adopted a laicist and modernist approach.

The license holder for the first seven issues were Zekeriya Sertel. He was imprisoned due to his articles published in Büyük Mecmua which criticised the Ottoman authorities due to their inability to stop invasion of the country by the Western countries. Following Zekeriya Sertel's imprisonment the license holder became his wife, Sabiha Sertel. The publisher was Diken Publishing Company. The first five issues were published weekly on Thursdays, but then it became a biweekly publication. 

The magazine covered many topics from political articles and women-related issues to arts, literary work, and poems. It also featured caricatures and presented some polls concerning the political situation of the country such as the implementation of the Wilson principles and the future of the nationalist movement. The contributors of Büyük Mecmua in addition to Sabiha and Zekeriya Sertel included many significant authors: Halide Edib Adıvar, Falih Rıfkı Atay, Faruk Nafiz Çamlıbel, Mehmed Fuad Köprülü, Ahmet Rasim and Ömer Seyfettin. Sabiha Sertel's early writings on feminism were published in Büyük Mecmua.

After publishing a total of seventeen issues Büyük Mecmua folded in 1920.

References

1919 establishments in the Ottoman Empire
1920 disestablishments in the Ottoman Empire
Biweekly magazines published in Turkey
Defunct political magazines published in Turkey
Magazines established in 1919
Magazines disestablished in 1920
Magazines published in Istanbul
Turkish-language magazines
Weekly magazines published in Turkey